Pedro Arrojo-Agudo is a Spanish physicist, economist, environmentalist, and a professor at the University of Zaragoza. He was awarded the Goldman Environmental Prize in 2003, for his contributions to conservation of water. He was made the United Nations Special Rapporteur on the human rights to safe drinking water and sanitation in October 2020.

References 

Year of birth missing (living people)
Living people
Academic staff of the University of Zaragoza
Spanish physicists
Spanish environmentalists
Goldman Environmental Prize awardees